Daniel Barend Jordaan (born 25 January 1991) is a South African professional rugby union player who played first class rugby with the  between 2012 and 2016. His regular position is lock.

Career

Youth

Jordaan also played a few matches for the s in the same competition. In 2011 and 2012, he represented the  side in the Under-21 Provincial Championship.

NWU Pukke / Leopards

He didn't feature in the ' 2014 Currie Cup qualification campaign, as  pipped the Leopards by a single point to earn a spot in the 2014 Currie Cup Premier Division, but he did make five starts for the Leopards in the 2014 Currie Cup First Division, helping them to finish top of the log, but losing to the fourth-placed  in the semi-finals.

References

South African rugby union players
Living people
1991 births
Rugby union players from Johannesburg
Rugby union locks
Leopards (rugby union) players